Caye Caulker Airport  is an airport that serves the island of Caye Caulker,  off the coast of Belize. After Maya Island Air and Tropic Air suspended service to Caye Caulker in 2017 due to the dangerous condition of the runway, the airport underwent a BZ$3.6 million renovation that included asphalt pavement and runway lighting.

Airlines and destinations

See also

Transport in Belize
List of airports in Belize

References

External links
OurAirports - Caye Caulker Airport

Aerodromes in Belize - pdf

Airports in Belize